James Hawkins Davison (1 November 1942 – 1987) was an English professional footballer who played as a winger for Sunderland from 1959–1963.

References

1942 births
1987 deaths
Footballers from Sunderland
English footballers
Association football wingers
Sunderland A.F.C. players
Bolton Wanderers F.C. players
Queen of the South F.C. players
English Football League players
Date of death missing